High on Emotion: Live from Dublin is the first live album by Chris de Burgh, released by A&M Records in 1990. The album was recorded at the RDS, Dublin in December 1988.

The double vinyl and cassette versions of the album featured 17 tracks from the concert. Due to the limitations of the running time of CD, the tracks 'Lonely Sky' and 'The Ballroom of Romance' were omitted from the CD version. These two tracks were included on the CD single release of the live version of 'Don't Pay the Ferryman' which was released to support the album. (This live version of 'The Ballroom of Romance' was also released as a B-side on a Germany-only single of 'Don't Look Back' released in 1989, over a year prior to the release of this album.)

A 81 minute concert film was widely released on VHS cassette in 1990, under the title "Chris de Burgh - Live From Dublin". This included the same track list as the vinyl and cassette releases, however with the track 'The Ballroom of Romance' missing. A very limited release of the video also took place on Laserdisc, a higher quality format.

A number of other songs were performed on this tour but are not included on any these releases. These include "Leather on my Shoes", "One Word (Straight to the Heart)", "A Night on the River", "Where Peaceful Waters Flow" and "The Getaway".

Track listing
All tracks composed by Chris de Burgh

"Last Night" - 7:07
"Sailing Away" - 5:19
"The Revolution" - 4:04
"I'm Not Scared Anymore" - 4:42
"Spanish Train" - 4:57
"Borderline" - 4:51
"The Risen Lord" - 3:35
"The Last Time I Cried" - 6:16
"The Lady in Red" - 4:07
"A Spaceman Came Travelling" - 3:43
"Patricia the Stripper" - 4:21
"Missing You" - 4:26
"Say Goodbye to It All" - 5:55
"Don't Pay the Ferryman" - 4:15
"High on Emotion" - 5:11

Track listing (compact cassette)
Side One
"Last Night"
"Sailing Away"
"The Revolution"
"I'm Not Scared Anymore"
"Spanish Train"
"Borderline"
"The Risen Lord"
"The Last Time I Cried"
Side Two
"The Lady in Red"
"Lonely Sky"
"A Spaceman Came Travelling"
"Patricia The Stripper"
"The Ballroom of Romance"
"Missing You"
"Say Goodbye To It All"
"Don't Pay The Ferryman"
"High On Emotion"

Personnel
 Chris de Burgh – guitar, piano, lead vocals
 Ian Kojima – guitar, keyboards, saxophone, backing vocals
 Danny McBride – lead guitar, backing vocals
 Al Marnie – bass guitar, backing vocals
 Glenn Morrow – keyboards, backing vocals
 Jeff Phillips – drums

Production
 Producers – Chris de Burgh, Gregg Jackman and Kenny Thomson.
 Engineered and Mixed by Gregg Jackman
 Assistant Engineers – Pete Craigie and Gary Stewart
 Recorded on Advison Mobile at RDS Arena (Dublin, Ireland).
 Mix Assistants – Simon Duff and Avril Mackintosh
 Mixed at Marcus Recording Studios (London, England).
 Mastered by Jack Adams at Tape One (London, England).
 Design – Normal Service
 Photography – Colm Henry and Dennis O'Reagan
 Liner Notes – Chris de Burgh
 Management – Dave Margereson and Kenny Thomson at Mismanagement, Inc.

Sales and certifications

References

External links
 The Official Chris de Burgh Website
 chrisdeburgh.net

Chris de Burgh albums
1990 live albums
A&M Records live albums